Karel Prager (August 24, 1923 in Kroměříž – May 31 2001 in Prague) was a Czech architect. He was one of the most prominent architects of modernist and brutalist architecture in the Czechoslovakia during the second half of 20th century. His works include Federal Assembly, National Theatre new building and Komerční banka buildings in Prague.

See also
Karel Teige

References
http://www.ngprague.cz/en/exposition-detail/karel-prager/

External links

People from Kroměříž
1923 births
2001 deaths
Czech architects
Brutalist architects